A. P. Jithender Reddy (born 26 April 1954 in Pedda Amudyalapadu Village, Mahbubnagar district) is an Indian politician from Telangana BJP. He was the Member of Parliament of Mahbubnagar from Telangana Rashtra Samithi Party in Telangana. He won the 2014 Indian general election being a Telangana Rashtra Samithi candidate.

In June 2019, Reddy along with Telugu Desam Party leader E. Peddi Reddy, D. K. Aruna, who served as a Minister in United Andhra Pradesh and former Congress MLC, P. Sudhakar Reddy joined the Bharatiya Janata Party.

References

Lok Sabha members from Telangana
India MPs 2014–2019
Living people
Telangana Rashtra Samithi politicians
People from Mahbubnagar district
1954 births
Telangana politicians
Bharatiya Janata Party politicians from Telangana